Hassan Chani (born 5 May 1988) is a Moroccan born Bahraini long-distance runner.

He represented Bahrain at the 2016 Summer Olympics in Rio de Janeiro, in the men's 10,000 metres.

References

External links

1988 births
Living people
Bahraini male long-distance runners
Olympic athletes of Bahrain
Athletes (track and field) at the 2016 Summer Olympics
Athletes (track and field) at the 2018 Asian Games
Moroccan emigrants to Bahrain
Naturalized citizens of Bahrain
Asian Games gold medalists in athletics (track and field)